Liverpool Township is one of twenty-six townships in Fulton County, Illinois, USA.  As of the 2010 census, its population was 544 and it contained 255 housing units.

Geography

Cities, towns, villages
 Liverpool

Unincorporated towns
 Little America
 Maples Mill
(This list is based on USGS data and may include former settlements.)

Extinct towns
 Keeler
 Salem
Pritchard

Cemeteries
The township contains these four cemeteries: Liverpool, Mount Pleasant, Pollitt and Salem.

Major highways
  US Route 24
  Illinois Route 78
  Illinois Route 97

Lakes
 Beebe Lake
 Goose Lake
 Lost Lake

Demographics

School districts
 Canton Union School District 66
 Lewistown School District 97

Political districts
 Illinois' 17th congressional district
 State House District 91
 State Senate District 46

References
 
 United States Census Bureau 2007 TIGER/Line Shapefiles
 United States National Atlas

External links
 City-Data.com
 Illinois State Archives

Townships in Fulton County, Illinois
Townships in Illinois